Alessio Tissone (born 16 February 1998) is an Italian football player, who plays as a defender for Savona.

Club career
He made his Serie C debut for Gavorrano on 3 September 2017 in a game against Olbia.

On 16 July 2018, he joined Imolese on a free transfer.

On 4 August 2019, he moved to Serie D club Savona.

References

External links
 

1998 births
People from Savona
Living people
Italian footballers
Association football defenders
U.S. Gavorrano players
Imolese Calcio 1919 players
Savona F.B.C. players
Serie C players
Serie D players
Footballers from Liguria
Sportspeople from the Province of Savona